Robert Shields may refer to:
Robert Shields (VC) (1827–1864), Welsh recipient of the Victoria Cross
Robert Shields (diarist) (1918–2007), American minister, teacher and diarist
Sir Robert Shields (surgeon) (1930–2008), professor of surgery, Liverpool University
Robert Shields (mime), member of mime duo Shields and Yarnell
Robert Shields, Scottish singer who goes by the stage name ONR.